Francesco (Francio) Mazza is an Italian writer, script-writer and director.

Career 
From 1999 to 2001, he was a recurring guest on Michele Santoro’s evening talk shows (Circus, Il Raggio Verde) aired on Rai 2.

In September 2001 he moved to Mediaset, becoming a reporter for the youth magazine Mosquito aired on Italia 1.

In 2003 he joined the crew of TV writer and producer Antonio Ricci. In 2005, he was one of the writer of Striscia la notizia (aired on Canale 5). He also worked on some Striscia’s spin-offs, such as Paperissima Sprint and Le Nuove Mostre.

In 2011, he was a script-writer of Big End, a sketch-com that aired on Rai 4.

After leaving Striscia in 2012, he graduated in filmmaking in New York in 2013.

In 2015, he wrote and directed the short film Frankie (Italian Roulette) in which he also acted as the main character. In 2016 it was nominated ("cinquina finalista") for a Nastro d'Argento in Rome. The co-writer of Frankie (Italian Roulette) is New York-based director Amos Poe.

He also wrote, directed and produced the TV documentary Graffiti a New York that premiered on Italian broadcaster Sky Arte HD on 20 November 2015. Graffiti a New York is presented by Italian journalist Federico Buffa and features some of the most relevant graffiti writers of all time, including the British photographer Jon Naar. Later on, the documentary screened at the Museum of Contemporary Art of Rome (MACRO).

In 2017 he directed the short film Broken Eggs, starring Michael Laurence and Nicole Arlyn, produced by Amos Poe. It screened at various festival in Italy and in the U.S.

On 10 October 2017 his web series Estremi Rimedi ("Full measures") was released online: it won “best screenplay” and “best actor” at the 6th Rome Web Fest. In 2019 it won for "best Italian web series" at the Digital Media Fest. By December, 2021, all the episodes have amassed over 50 million views on Facebook.

In 2018, he wrote and directed the TV documentary Ettore Majorana - L’Uomo del futuro on the life and the legacy of Italian scientist Ettore Majorana. It premiered on Sky Arte HD on March 28 for the 80th anniversary of Majorana’s mysterious disappearance.

In 2021, he wrote and directed his fifth short film Infelici e contenti ("Happily unhappy"). For her role in this movie, Italian actress Angelica Cacciapaglia won for "best supporting actress" at the MISFF -Montecatini International Short Film Festival, the longest-running Italian festival dedicated to short films.

As a writer, in 2020 he wrote the non-fiction book Volevo essere nessuno ("I wanted to be nobody") published by Mondadori and translated in English. In 2021 his memoir "Il veleno nella coda"  ("The poison in the tail") was published by Laurana editore. It received positive reviews from the critics and was ranked seventh in the weekly chart of "Robinson".

For years, he has been writing op-eds, satirical articles and special reports for various international media outlets. His works appeared in Libération, Linkiesta, Charlie Hebdo, RaiNews24 among others. In 2016 he won the Macchianera Internet Award for best article of the year, with an article about Charlie Hebdo Comics published on the Italian online magazine Gli Stati Generali.

TV shows

Filmography

Books

References

External links 
 Official website

1982 births
Living people
Italian male writers
Writers from New York (state)